Devegeçidi Dam is one of the 22 dams of the Southeastern Anatolia Project of Turkey, Diyarbakır. It is near Diyarbakır on a branch of the Tigris river. It was constructed for irrigation purposes between 1965 and 1972.

Notes

References

External links
 www.gap.gov.tr - Official GAP web site

Dams in Diyarbakır Province
Southeastern Anatolia Project
Buildings and structures in Diyarbakır
Dams completed in 1972
Rock-filled dams
Dams in the Tigris River basin
Important Bird Areas of Turkey